Rochelle Jordan is a Canadian R&B musician from Toronto, Canada.

History
Jordan released her first album in 2011 titled ROJO. In 2012, Jordan released her second album titled Pressure. Jordan released her third album, 1021, in 2014. Seven years after the release of her third album, Jordan released her fourth and latest album, Play With The Changes.

Discography
ROJO (2011)
Pressure (2012)
1021 (2014)
Play With The Changes (2021)

References

Musicians from Toronto
Year of birth missing (living people)
Living people